Metteniusa huilensis is a species of flowering plants in the family Metteniusaceae. It was formerly placed in the family Cardiopteridaceae. It is endemic to Colombia.

References

Metteniusaceae
Vulnerable plants
Endemic flora of Colombia
Taxonomy articles created by Polbot